Alexandros Pagalis (born 4 February 1988 in Athens) is a Greek footballer currently playing for Asteras Petriti in the Gamma Ethniki , as a defender.

Career
Pagalis who began his career in the Panathinaikos youth academy and played there until June 2006. He had also played for Niki Volou, Fostiras  and AS Trenčín. He also played for AEK Larnaca and Ethnikos Assia in Cyprus.

References

External links
 

1988 births
Living people
Footballers from Athens
Greek footballers
Greek expatriate footballers
Greek expatriate sportspeople in Slovakia
Greek expatriate sportspeople in Cyprus
Expatriate footballers in Slovakia
Expatriate footballers in Cyprus
Panathinaikos F.C. players
Niki Volos F.C. players
AS Trenčín players
2. Liga (Slovakia) players
AEK Larnaca FC players
Ethnikos Assia FC players
Association football defenders
Cypriot Second Division players
Gamma Ethniki players